Arístides Sócrates Henríquez Nolasco was a writer from the Dominican Republic. He was born in what is now Enriquillo in Barahona Province on March 20, 1884, and died in Santo Domingo on July 2, 1980. The parents of Sócrates Nolasco (as he is usually called) were Juliana Nolasco and Manuel Henríquez y Carvajal. Some of his formative years, from 1906 to 1913, were spent in Cuba, in the city of Santiago de Cuba, and he later returned to that nearby country, to Havana, living there from 1951 to 1954.

Nolasco was a relatively prolific writer, and helped develop a body of work related to the Dominican Republic. His works have been compiled into three volumes, dealing with his stories, historical essays, and literary essays.

References 

1884 births
1980 deaths
Dominican Republic male writers
Dominican Republic literature